Andrzej Rej (died 1664) was a Polish nobleman. An active Calvinist, he held the title of stolnik of Lublin. From 1659 to 1661 he served as starost of Małogoszcz. He was the great-grandson of the poet Mikołaj Rej.

Bibliography 
M. Rawita-Witanowski, Dawny powiat chęciński, Kielce 2002, s. 277-288
T. Żychliński, Złota księga szlachty polskiej, t. XV, s. 123

External links 
 http://www.wielcy.pl/psb/REY/Andrzej/25982.shtml/
 The Dwór Rejów in Nagłowicach

1664 deaths
Andrzej
Year of birth unknown